Jefferson is an unincorporated community in the Pine Bluff metropolitan area of northwestern Jefferson County in the U.S. state of Arkansas.

History
Originally named Jefferson Springs, Arkansas, it was founded on October 3, 1881, the result of the newly built Chicot to Little Rock railroad.

Economy

Jefferson is home to the National Center for Toxicological Research and is co-located with the Office of Regulatory Affairs’ Arkansas Regional Laboratory. NCTR is the only Food & Drug Administration (FDA) Center located outside the Washington D.C. metropolitan area. The  research campus plays a critical role in the missions of FDA and the U.S. Department of Health & Human Services to promote and protect public health.

Education
Jefferson is served by the White Hall School District.

Notable residents
W. B. Jacko, American politician

References

Further reading

External links

 Redfield Library at the Pine Bluff and Jefferson County Library System

1881 establishments in Arkansas
Pine Bluff metropolitan area
Populated places established in 1881
Unincorporated communities in Jefferson County, Arkansas